G. armeniaca may refer to:
 Gongora armeniaca, an orchid species
 Grifola armeniaca, a fungus species in the genus Grifola

See also
 Armeniaca (disambiguation)